Michiel Kramer (born 3 December 1988) is a Dutch professional footballer who plays as a forward for RKC Waalwijk. He formerly played for NAC Breda, FC Volendam, ADO Den Haag, Feyenoord, Sparta Rotterdam, Maccabi Haifa and FC Utrecht. His main position is forward but he also plays as a second striker.

Career
Kramer was born in Rotterdam. He joined FC Volendam from NAC Breda in June 2009. He scored his first goal on 4 December 2009 in an away match against FC Emmen in a 4–2 win, actually with Kramer scoring a clean hattrick. In 2013 Kramer joined ADO Den Haag.

ADO Den Haag
In 2013 Kramer joined ADO Den Haag. In 2014 Kramer had one of his best scoring in ratio to games, scoring 11 goals in 17 matches.

Feyenoord
On 7 August 2015, it was announced that Kramer signed a contract with hometown club Feyenoord, who he has supported since his childhood. Kramer made his Feyenoord-debut on 16 August 2015, in an away game against SC Cambuur, coming on as a substitute in the 62nd minute. With the score still at 0–0, Kramer opened the scoring 15 minutes later, therefore scoring on his debut to secure what would be a 2–0 victory for Feyenoord. On 1 February 2018, it was announced that Kramer had been released from his contract.

Sparta Rotterdam
On 12 February 2018, Kramer signed a contract for the remainder of the season at Sparta Rotterdam. This contract was cancelled again on 19 April 2018, after Kramer received a red card in Sparta's 7–0 defeat against Vitesse for kicking Vitesse player Alexander Büttner in the face. The resulting suspension was for seven games costing him the remaining matches of the season. Kramer played eight games for Sparta Rotterdam, scoring twice.

Maccabi Haifa
On 30 May 2018, it was reported that Kramer would continue his career at Maccabi Haifa in the Israeli Premier League. On his first league match for the Israeli side, Kramer was suspended for foul language.

FC Utrecht
On 23 January 2019, he returned to the Netherlands, signing for FC Utrecht on a free transfer.

Return to ADO Den Haag
Kramer returned to ADO Den Haag in July 2019 on a two-year contract.

RKC Waalwijk
On 20 July 2021, Kramer signed for fellow Eredivisie side RKC Waalwijk on a free transfer.

Career statistics

Honours
Feyenoord
 Eredivisie: 2016–17
 KNVB Cup: 2015–16
 Johan Cruyff Shield: 2017

References

External links

Living people
1988 births
Association football forwards
Footballers from Rotterdam
Dutch footballers
NAC Breda players
FC Volendam players
ADO Den Haag players
Feyenoord players
Sparta Rotterdam players
Maccabi Haifa F.C. players
FC Utrecht players
RKC Waalwijk players
Eredivisie players
Eerste Divisie players
Israeli Premier League players
Dutch expatriate footballers
Expatriate footballers in Israel
Dutch expatriates in Israel